Persia's Got Talent with acronym PGT  is a spin-off of the British talent show Got Talent aimed at Persian-speaking audiences across the world, mainly in Iran (also known as "Persia"). It is produced outside Iran and is aired on MBC Persia, part of the Middle East Broadcasting Center, since 31 January 2020.

The first season was filmed in Sweden, which is home to a large Persian-speaking population. As in other Got Talent shows, competitors of Persia's Got Talent perform for judges and audience votes and the winner receives a cash prize. The contest is open to anyone speaking Persian.

The show is hosted by commercial model Farzan Athari and actress Tara Grammy. The judges are Iranian pop legend Ebi, well-known singer and Eurovision finalist Arash, well-known actress Mahnaz Afshar, and entertainer Nazanin Nour.
In the end of the season, Navid became the champion, YasAmin became the runner-up and Negar came in third.

Seasons overview

See also
The Voice Persia
Stage (Iranian TV series)
Persian Talent Show

References

External links
 
 
 
 Persia's Got Talent on YouTube
 Persia's Got Talent's App on Google Play

Got Talent
Television series by Fremantle (company)
Television shows filmed in Sweden
Non-British television series based on British television series
Persian-language television shows
2020 in Iranian television
2020 Iranian television series debuts